Hele & Co (also known as Hele & Sons) were the main organ builders in the south west of England from 1865 to 2007.

History

The company was founded by George Hele (1836–1919). Initially George concentrated on selling organs, pianos and harmoniums, but in 1865 he started work in Truro building his first instrument, an organ for Devoran Wesleyan Methodist Chapel.

On 12 June 1859 at Stoke-Damerel he married Mary Ann Calvert (1835-1919).

In 1870 he moved to Plymouth where the company was based until 2007.

During the early years of the twentieth century Hele & Co. expanded, building organs for many churches in the locality.

After the Second World War,  J. W. Walker & Sons Ltd took a controlling interest which lasted for several years. After regaining independence, the company continued, but in 2007 it merged with The Midland Organ Company under a new name, Midland Organ Hele and Company Ltd.

Notable instruments
Devoran Wesleyan Methodist Chapel 1865
Church of King Charles the Martyr, Falmouth 1881
St Michael and All Angels Church, Penwerris 1889
St Michael the Archangel's Church, Chagford 1891
All Saints' Church, Falmouth 1894
St Uny's Church, Lelant 1913

References

Pipe organ building companies
Organ builders of the United Kingdom
Companies established in 1865
Companies based in Plymouth, Devon
Musical instrument manufacturing companies of the United Kingdom